Easter is an independent film based on the play by the same name by Will Scheffer. It is directed by Richard Caliban who also wrote the screenplay with Will Scheffer, and stars Jodie Markell, Barry Del Sherman, Sean Runnette, and Max Wright in his final film role before his death in June 2019.

Plot 
Wilma (Jodie Markell) and Matthew (Barry Del Sherman) Ransom are a married couple trying to escape their past, but it always catches up with them.

Wilma struggles with indulging in her fantasies, causing her to see Herman Warm Sean Runnette.  She drives into town and stops at a local church where she buys a used wedding dress.  Next she buys candles and religious supplies from an old shopkeeper named Zaddock Pratt Max Wright.  Around this time, Matthew drives by the church to notice it's on fire due to arson.  He quickly realizes that his wife is back to her old tricks of burning churches.

Matthew confronts Wilma about the burning church, and she tells him the reason why she burns churches.  She blames him for the death of their child that she miscarried, telling him she hates him.

Production 
Filmed during the summer of 2000, the filmmakers had the assistance and supervision from the Hastings Fire Department in the burning of an actual farmhouse.  The burning of the church was accomplished using visual effects.

Filming locations
Easter takes place in and around the fictional town of Prattsville, but was shot in Hastings and Harvard, Nebraska. The football game flashback was filmed at Hastings High School.

Reception
In his review of Easter for Variety on April 23, 2003, Todd McCarthy noted that the film had been "Transferred from the 1997 Off Broadway stage production with playwright Will Scheffer, director Richard Caliban and leading lady Jodie Markell all remaining on board" and concluded that [the] "Sub-Tennessee Williams portrait of a troubled woman losing her moorings to reality doesn’t make a true emotional connection for a moment."

Awards
 Telluride Indiefest 2003 - Best Feature 
 Empire State Film Festival 2003 - Silver Torch and Best Actress awards

References

External links

 

American independent films
Films shot in Nebraska
Films scored by Jeff Danna
2000s English-language films
2000s American films